Chuck Lorre Productions is an American television production company founded in January 2000 by producer Chuck Lorre, best known for producing the long-running television series Two and a Half Men, The Big Bang Theory, Mom, and Young Sheldon.

History

Chuck Lorre Productions was founded in the 1990s, but incorporated on January 10, 2000 in Los Angeles, California, by American television director, writer, producer, composer and actor Chuck Lorre. The company is headquartered at Warner Bros. Studios in Burbank, California.

In March 1994, the company entered an exclusive overall deal with The Carsey-Werner Company. The company's founder, Chuck Lorre, began his affiliation with Carsey-Werner in 1990 as supervising producer on Roseanne. In October 1995, the company entered a four-year overall deal with 20th Century Fox Television, for an estimated US$12 million.

In September 1999, the company entered a four-year production pact with Warner Bros. Television, for an estimated US$8 million a year. The company's move to Warner Bros. was in relation to the former 20th Century Fox Television president, Peter Roth, who became the president of Warner Bros. Television in March 1999, bringing Lorre to Warner Bros. Television. In August 2012, the company entered a four-year overall development and production deal with Warner Bros. Television.

Filmography

Current

In production

Former

References

External links
 

Mass media companies established in 2000
Television production companies of the United States
2000 establishments in California